Eleanora or Eleonora is a female given name and may refer to one of the following:

Eleanora Atherton (1782–1870), English philanthropist
Eleonora Duse (1858–1924), Italian actress, often known simply as Duse
Eleonora Ehrenbergů (1832–1912), Czech operatic soprano
Eleanora Fagan (1915–1959), birth name of US jazz singer Billie Holiday
Eleonora Luisa Gonzaga (1686–1741), Duchess of Rovere and Montefeltro as the wife of Francesco Maria de' Medici
Eleonora, Princess of Ligne, wife of Michel, 14th Prince of Ligne
Ulrika Eleonora or Ulrica Eleanor (1688–1741), a queen of Sweden

Eleanora and Eleonora may also refer to:

Eleonora's falcon (Falco eleonorae) is a medium-sized falcon, belonging to the hobby group
"Eleanora", a popular song recorded by Percy Faith
"Eleonora", a short story by Edgar Allan Poe

Italian feminine given names